Azygophleps otello is a moth in the family Cossidae. It is found in Mauritania.

References

Moths described in 2011
Azygophleps
Endemic fauna of Mauritania